Gary Edward William Day (born 27 June 1965) is a British musician known for playing bass for Morrissey, The Gazmen, The Nitros, Carlos and the Bandidos, and The Poncés.

Early life
Day learned the double bass in his late teens, the Rockabilly slap-style of playing after being influenced by the UK Rock 'n' Roll and Psychobilly scene bands, especially The Meteors and their bass player Nigel Lewis. Day also revisited classic 1950s rock 'n' roll music, and as time passed he became interested in other forms of music as a natural progression, hence finding new influences to ferment his style, e.g. jazz and blues musicians such as Carol Kaye, Willie Dixon, Red Callender, and Charlie Mingus. Day learnt to play the electric bass before joining the Morrissey band.

Music career
Day originally played for Morrissey from 1990, and after rehearsals played through 1991 on the Kill Uncle tour, recording sessions followed for singles and the 1992 album Your Arsenal, and the tour promotion through 1992,  but was fired in 1994. He was then re-hired in 1999 for Morrissey's Oye Esteban tour, the "You Are Quarry" album singles and tour, he remained the band's bassist until he parted ways at the end of the "Ringleader Of The Tormentors" album and tour in 2006, to spend time with his family and to work on his material. Day did not participate in any of Morrissey's recording sessions' in 2007. He also composed music for Morrissey, including early session material including "Pashernate Love", "Let The Right One Slip In" and "Mexico". 

The Memphis Sinners became the Morrissey backing band, consisting of Spencer Cobrin, Alain Whyte, and Gary Day.

Throughout his career, Day has played either double or electric bass with several bands, including The Caravans, Frantic Flintstones, Colbert Hamilton, The Nitros, The Sharks, and The Memphis Sinners. He has also played with Empress of Fur, and a personal triumph of his was playing with The New York Dolls on a one-off engagement, but could not do more shows at the time due to other work commitments.

Day's group, The Gazmen (which featured fellow Morrissey guitarist Alain Whyte along with two members of The Sharks, Alan Wilson, and Paul Hodges) released a four-track EP entitled Rigormortis Rock in September 2000, which was a re-release of the group's 1995 12 inch vinyl EP (on the Vinyl Japan label) also called Rigamortis Rock, and re-released again in 2020. 

Aside from working on his projects, ie with Florence Joelle, Day is also a frequent DJ.

In late 2012, Day joined the alternative country band the Ely Plains. He left the band in October of the next year.

In early 2015, Day, after contacting Clive Franklin, vocalist and lyricist from London-based band The Poncés, he became involved with their first album, playing double and electric bass on the album Songs For Hope About Despair, The Poncés first album release on Sub-Ver-Siv records thinking Day would be the ideal bassist for his songs, he was right! Day also lent his studio experience skills and assisted in the mixing and mastering of the album, and was released in February 2016. Day joined the band as a full-time member and proceeded to record double bass on Franklin's Latin and Jazz projects. A new Poncés album is due for release in 2021 and was partly recorded and produced at Day's Rhythm Chief Studios, alongside released singles listed below and other songs in various stages of production!

Day also played on a rock and roll session for Denvir Jet, a cover of Gene Vincent's Cat Man the flip to a Denvir Jet single, being the young guitar prodigies second 45 rpm release from one of Franklin's recording sessions on Prince Records Inc.

Day is the double bass player for Carlos and the Bandidos as well and composed the single "Beautiful Suicide" released on Migraine records. With a future album release. 

Day continues to play bass in many genres of music and has recently played on The Sons' The Tension Of Dream Clouds, which was released in May 2015. He also plays double bass alongside drummer Spike T Smith, also an ex-Morrissey band member in Reza Uhdin's band Black Volition on occasions.

Discography
The Frantic Flintstones
Nightmare on Nervous (1987)
The Sharks
Recreational Killer (1993)
Bitch Attack (1994)
The Very Best of The Sharks (2002)
Colbert Hamilton and The Nitros
Wild at Heart (1994)
Morrissey
Your Arsenal (1992)
Beethoven Was Deaf (1993)
World of Morrissey (1995)
Suedehead: The Best of Morrissey (1997)
My Early Burglary Years (1998)
The CD Singles '91–95' (2000)
The Best of Morrissey (2001)
You Are the Quarry (2004)
Live at Earls Court (2005)
Ringleader of the Tormentors (2006)
Greatest Hits (2009)

Denvir Jet and The Soho Ponces
"Flash Of Inspiration" b/w "Cat Man" (2015), vinyl single

Prince Monolulu and The Soho Ponces
"Eee Ooo Prince Monolulu" b/w "Misirlou" (2015), vinyl single
"Caravan" b/w "Caravan" (2016), vinyl single

The Poncés
"Slaughter of Soho" b/w "Beautiful Songs That Tell You Terrible Things" (2015), vinyl single 
"London Belongs to Me" b/w "The Sediment of Love" (2016), vinyl single
"Midnight Black" b/w "Nightmares of You" (2016), vinyl single
"Songs for Hope About Despair" (2016), 12" vinyl album/CD and gatefold reissue (2020)
"Singled Out and Left to Wallow (2017), compilation album on download
"Instant Gratification" b/w "Cosmic Dancer" (2017), vinyl single
"Rock 'n' Roll Chameleon" b/w "Rock 'n' Roll Suicide" "Lurid City" EP (2018), download and single
"The Human Jungle" b/w "5 Minutes Past Midnight" (2018), single 
"Cuentos De Lo Inesperado", future release album in 2021

Carlos and the Bandidos
"Beautiful Suicide" (2019), single

References

1965 births
Living people
British bass guitarists
Male bass guitarists